Mile Run is a tributary of the Raritan River in New Brunswick, New Jersey, in the United States.

Its name is derived from the distance early surveyors estimated it was on the historic King's Highway, Route 27, from the Raritan River crossing. Other streams, such as the Six Mile Run and the Nine Mile Run are named similarly.

Course
Mile Run drains an area in the suburbs of New Brunswick. It crosses Jersey Avenue and flows through a residential development near Livingston Avenue (SR-26). It then crosses some railroad tracks and crosses Jersey Ave. It crosses French Street (SR-27) one mile from the Raritan River, giving it its name. It flows between residential areas and crosses Hamilton Street.

Mile Run forms part of the boundary between Somerset and Middlesex Counties.

Accessibility
Mile Run flows through a heavily developed area, making it easily accessible.

Animal life
Mile Run has stress on it because of the city surrounding it, possibly harming the aquatic life.

See also
List of rivers of New Jersey

References

External links
USGS Coordinates in Google Maps

Rivers of Middlesex County, New Jersey
Rivers of Somerset County, New Jersey
Rivers of New Jersey
Tributaries of the Raritan River
New Brunswick, New Jersey